Urethral intercourse or coitus per urethram is sexual penetration of the female urethra by an object such as a penis or a finger.  It is not the same thing as urethral sounding, the act of inserting a specialized medical tool into the urethra as a form of sexual or fetishistic activity.

The untrained insertion of foreign bodies into the urethra carries a significant risk that subsequent medical attention may be required.  Documented cases of urethral intercourse appear to have occurred between heterosexual couples;  a survey of the global medical literature available in 1965 reported accounts of thirteen separate cases. By 2014, 26 cases had been documented in the medical literature, many in people with Müllerian dysgenesis who were engaging in urethral intercourse unknowingly. However, the stretching of the urethra required by this form of intercourse has also reportedly resulted in a complete and permanent loss of urethral sphincter control (urinary incontinence); furthermore such intercourse presents a very high risk of bladder infection to the receptive partner. It can also lead to permanent dilation of the urethra and incontinence during intercourse. Presenting symptoms of unintentional urethral intercourse include primary infertility, dyspareunia (pain during intercourse), and incontinence. More serious consequences include evisceration via the urethra and bladder rupture.

See also 
 Urethral sounding

References

External links 

Sexual acts
Human sexuality
Urethra
Pediatric gynecology
Sexual fetishism